Lémery is a French surname. Notable people with the surname include:

 Henry Lémery (1874–1972), Martinique politician
 José Lemery e Ibarrola Ney (1811-1886), Spanish general
 Louis Lémery (1677–1743), French botanist and chemist
 Nicolas Lemery (1645–1715), French chemist

French-language surnames